Agustín Sebastián Cousillas (born 19 April 1990) is an Argentine footballer who plays for Chacarita Juniors as a goalkeeper.

Club career
Born in Roque Pérez, Buenos Aires province, Cousillas graduated from local Tigre, and was promoted to the first team in 2011. However, he acted only as a backup to Daniel Islas and Javier García.

Islas subsequently left the club in the 2011 summer, but Cousillas remained behind García and new signing Damián Albil. On 2 December 2012 he played his first match as a professional, replacing Albil in a 0–1 loss at Belgrano. He was handed his first start on 6 March of the following year, in a 1–0 home win against Palmeiras for the year's Copa Libertadores.

On 27 June 2014 Cousillas moved abroad for the first time of his career, joining Málaga CF and being assigned to the reserves.

Personal life
Cousillas' father, Rubén, was also a footballer and a goalkeeper.

References

External links
 
 
 
 

1990 births
Living people
Sportspeople from Buenos Aires Province
Argentine footballers
Argentine expatriate footballers
Association football goalkeepers
Club Atlético Tigre footballers
Atlético Malagueño players
Villa Teresa players
Unión La Calera footballers
C.A. Rentistas players
Club Aurora players
Chacarita Juniors footballers
Argentine Primera División players
Tercera División players
Uruguayan Segunda División players
Primera B de Chile players
Bolivian Primera División players
Primera Nacional players
Argentine expatriate sportspeople in Spain
Argentine expatriate sportspeople in Uruguay
Argentine expatriate sportspeople in Chile
Argentine expatriate sportspeople in Bolivia
Expatriate footballers in Spain
Expatriate footballers in Uruguay
Expatriate footballers in Chile
Expatriate footballers in Bolivia